HD 191220, also known as HR 7698, is a solitary white hued star located in the southern circumpolar constellation Octans. It has an apparent magnitude of 6.14, placing it near the limit for naked eye visibility. At its current distance, HD 191220's brightness is diminished by 0.22 magnitudes due to interstellar dust.

This is a chemically peculiar Am star with a stellar classification of A2/3mA8-F0, an A-type star with the metallic lines of a star with a class of A8-F0. It has double the mass of the Sun and 2.2 times its girth. HD 191220 is estimated to be nearly a billion years old and has a near solar metallicity — what astronomers dub a star's abundance of chemical elements heavier than helium.

References

A-type main-sequence stars
Am stars
Octans
191220
100697
7698
CD-83 00253
Octantis, 45